Monopetalotaxis candescens is a moth of the family Sesiidae. It is known from South Africa.

The larvae bore the roots of Aspalathus linearis. They are considered the principal insect pest associated with rooibos or red bush tea production. Annual moth flights peak during November and December, resulting in young plantations being targeted during the hot, dry summer conditions prevailing at this time.

References

Endemic moths of South Africa
Sesiidae
Moths of Africa